This is a list of the mayors of the City of Launceston, Tasmania, Australia.

1853–1900

1901–2001

2001–present

References

External links
 Launceston City Council 

Launceston